Admiral The Honourable Duncombe Pleydell-Bouverie (28 June 1780 – 5 November 1850), was a British naval commander and Whig politician.

Pleydell-Bouverie was the second son of Jacob Pleydell-Bouverie, 2nd Earl of Radnor, and the Honourable Anne Duncombe, daughter of Anthony Duncombe, 1st Baron Feversham. William Pleydell-Bouverie, 3rd Earl of Radnor, was his elder brother.

Pleydell-Bouverie served in the Royal Navy, entering the Academy at Portsmouth in 1793. He was promoted to Lieutenant on 16 February 1799 and to Commander on 14 February 1801. His first command was HMS Penguin from 28 August. He held this command for seven years, taking part in the operations in the Río de la Plata (1806-7) including the blockade and siege of Montevideo. 

In November 1806, Medusa apprehended the American trading brig Harry and Jane, and pressed a number of its crew into service with the Royal Navy. Included in these "volunteers" was an English sailor, George Thomas, who was a skilled navigator. Bouverie rapidly promoted him, and he went on to become a distinguished hydrographic surveyor. Bouverie, supported by Alexander Dalrymple Hydrographer of the Navy, published a report with sailing directions for the Río de la Plata based on his own observations and surveys.

Upon returning from South America, Bouverie continued to be active in the war with France and Spain, being noted particularly for his actions in support of the anti-French forces in the north of Spain. 

From 1828 to 1831 he commanded , was promoted to Rear-Admiral on 10 January 1837, and to Vice-Admiral on 9 November 1846.

He also sat as Member of Parliament for Downton between 1806 and 1807 and for Salisbury between 1828 and 1832 and again from 1833 to 1835. He is not recorded as having ever spoken in the House of Commons.

Pleydell-Bouverie married Louisa, daughter of Joseph May, in 1809. He died in November 1850, aged 70.

References

External links 
 
 

1780 births
1850 deaths
Younger sons of earls
Royal Navy admirals
UK MPs 1806–1807
UK MPs 1826–1830
UK MPs 1830–1831
UK MPs 1831–1832
UK MPs 1832–1835
Members of the Parliament of the United Kingdom for English constituencies
Whig (British political party) MPs for English constituencies
People from Vale of White Horse (district)